Audrey Glenys Bates (1922-2001) was a Welsh international in four sports for Wales: table tennis, tennis squash and lacrosse.

Early life
She was educated at Howell's School, Llandaff, and was later the school's games coach.

Table tennis career
She won a bronze medal in the 1951 World Table Tennis Championships in the Corbillon Cup (women's team event) with Audrey Coombs and Betty Gray for Wales.

Squash career
She was an international squash player and competed in the British Open Squash Championships as a seeded player. She played for Wales between 1947 and 1965.

Tennis career
She first played tennis at the Radyr club age just 9, before joining the Whitchurch and Cardiff Lawn Tennis Club. Audrey played at Wimbledon in the singles and doubles and was a member of the Welsh lawn tennis team from 1947 to 1954.

Awards and honors
Bates was inducted into the Welsh Sports Hall of Fame in 2002.

See also
 List of table tennis players
 List of World Table Tennis Championships medalists

References

Welsh female table tennis players
Welsh female squash players
Welsh female tennis players
Sportspeople from Cardiff
1922 births
2001 deaths
British female tennis players
World Table Tennis Championships medalists